Yunohamella palmgreni is a species of comb-footed spider in the family Theridiidae. It is found in Poland, Finland, Estonia, and Russia as far east as Siberia. Yunohamella palmegreni has also been observed in Sweden in recent years.

References

Theridiidae
Spiders described in 1986
Spiders of Asia
Spiders of Europe